Reid Speed (born Amy Margolis) is a multi-genre DJ who specializes in dubstep, drum and bass, trap, and electro. She owns and runs Play Me Records out of Santa Monica, California.

Biography

Music
When Reid Speed began spinning records in 1996, she first generated curiosity as one of few female DJs at the time. However, she quickly earned respect for her talent in the highly competitive New York City DJ scene. By the summer of 1997, she was working with rave promoters Stuck on Earth Promotions and the following year as a member of the Direct Drive crew.

Play Me Records, her label, is a leading force in the American end of dubstep. Reid has now a second label, Play Me Too Records. As one of the first US DJs to champion speed garage & 2 step.

Reid started out in the New York City underground working behind the counter at the legendary Breakbeat Science store, holding residencies with Stuck on Earth, Direct Drive & Camouflage while in college at the School of Visual Arts. Drum and bass at the start, she was soon was seduced by the sounds of 2 step and speed garage and began DJing full-time, producing tracks and throwing her own events. Signing to Breakbeat Science's label in 2001, she released her first mix "Resonance" to much critical acclaim, and successfully followed it up with 2003's "Life After Dark." On subsequent tours with Om artists Ming (DJ) & FS and Colette she honed her precise genre mashing mixing skills and developed a synergy with her crowds that is unmatched. Her tunes and mixes get play from many of the world's most respected radio stations and DJs including BBC/ Annie Nightingale (voted Reid Best Mix of 2008), Sweidish Egil (Power 106 LA), Z-trip, Drop the Lime, Jaimie Fanatic, 12th Planet, Bassnectar & DJ Dan. Whether on the floor, in the studio or behind the decks Reid keeps pushing boundaries forward every step she takes.

Tours
Reid toured the US from June 2011 to October 2011 with Sub Antix, FS, and Cyberoptics as part of Play Me Records' Bass Monster Tour.

Reid's tracks and mixes have been featured on/by:

Showtime Shonext, Puma, Adidas, BBC Radio 1 (Annie Nightingale's Best Mix of 2008), LA Power 106, Sirius, I Heart Comix, NickyDigital, Groove Radio, Dogs On Acid, Missingtoof, Discodust, Hype Machine, Crux Da House, NerdyFrames, Media Contender, "Bomb It" History of Graffiti Documentary.

TV/Print appearances
In 2003, Reid was chosen to play her blend of drum & bass on Jamie Kennedy's show, The Jamie Kennedy Experiment on the WB Television Network. She also appeared in an episode of Spike TV's MDN. In 2005, she was chosen to judge BPM Magazine & Rockstar energy drink's "Beauty & the Beats" contest with DJ Rap and Colette. A subsequent tour garnered much attention, including an appearance on Bravo's "Blowout".

Other appearances: MDN, "Concentric Beats" Documentary, "Sabotage" short film, Nylon, Paper, Flaunt, Gear, LA Weekly, Village Voice, Vice, The Fader, Urb, XLR8R, Mixer, Karma, Tokyon, Metropop, Frank151

Notable Events
Diesel, Scion, J. Lindberg, Rockstar, Skullcandy, LA Natural History Museum, Beautiful Decay, US Capitol Lawn protest

2014
New Zealand:
Code Bar in Auckland, Friday 18 of July
The Block Party in Hamilton, Saturday 19 July

Sponsors

Shure, Pioneer, Native Instruments, Stanton, Numark, Tascam, Triple 5 Soul, Matix, Sinful, JNCO, Junkytees.

Discography

EPs
 Reeespect (2001)
 Resonance (2002)
 Life After Dark (2003)
 Under The Influence (2009)
 We Love The Blunts (2012) with Proper Villains

Singles
 "S-I-M-P-L-O-T (Original Mix)" (2000) w/ FS
 "PantyDrop" w/ Flinch
 "Why Don't You Pay Me" w/ Flinch
 "Shake Dat" w/ Flinch
 "Danger" w/ Queensyze
 "Prosti-tot" (2009) w/ Mike Balance
 "U Hold The Weed" w/ Dino
 "Jailbait Rinse" (2009) w/ Hot Mouth
 "Fangbanger" (2010) w/ Dino
 "Bass Monster" (2011) w/ FS

Remixes
 "Krafty Kuts & Tim Deluxe - Bass Phenomenon" (2007) w/ Josh David
 "Datcyde - Naughty Ride VIP" (2009)
 "Jaimie Fanatic & Kelevra - We Are All Kidz" (2009) w/ Mike Balance
 "Doc Trashz - The Battle" (2009)
 "Sporty-O - Motion" (2010)
 "Dirty Talk - P.O.T." (2011) w/ FS

Tracks released as Breakdown
MC Flipside "What It's About" (Breakdown Remix) (PBR)
Breakdown feat. Whisky Pete & Julz "Play With It" (PBR)
Oh Snap & Jen Lasher- "So Dynamite" (Breakdown Remix) 
Jamie Fanatic "Double Dutch Buzz" (Breakdown Remix)
Breakdown "Break The System" w/ Mightyfools Remix (Illeven:Eleven)
Breakdown "Team Axel" w/ Will Bailey Remix (Promo)
DJ Kue "Lover's Break" (Breakdown Remix) (InStereo)
Breakdown "Do What I Want" (Illeven Eleven)
Robb G "Heavy" (Breakdown Remix) (Promo)
DJ Kue "Dont Get High" (Breakdown Remix)
Harley Schoolkid "From Paris With Love" (Breakdown Remix) (DUG )
Effekt "Abuser" (Breakdown's Wonkyshizzle Remix) (DUG)
Cybersutra "Dope" (Breakdown Remix) (Shush)
Krafty Kuts "The Bass Phenomenon" (Breakdown Remix) (Against The Grain/Supercharged)

References

External links
Official SoundCloud
Exclusive Interview with DJ Reid Speed
[ DJ Reid Speed bio on allmusic.com]
Interview in Lunar' Magazine

≤

Year of birth missing (living people)
Living people
American electronic musicians
Breakbeat musicians
Club DJs
Women DJs
Participants in American reality television series
Remixers
American women record producers